NBS Sport  is a Ugandan sports television network based in Kampala, Uganda.

Location
Its headquarter is located at Next Media Park, Plot 13, summit view Road, Kampala, Uganda.

Overview 
The channel was launched on 8 June 2022 and it started broadcasting on that same day.
The station is known for its focus on sports 24/7,  with covering live sports events in Uganda like the national Basketball League, Pool Table competitions, Uganda Boxing Champions League among others.

References

Television stations in Uganda
English-language television stations
Television channels and stations established in 2022